The 2014–15 Davidson Wildcats men's basketball team represented Davidson College during the 2014–15 NCAA Division I men's basketball season. The Wildcats, led by 26th year head coach Bob McKillop, played their home games at the John M. Belk Arena and were first year members of the Atlantic 10 Conference. They finished the season 24–8, 14–4 in A-10 play to win the A-10 regular season championship. They advanced to the semifinals of the A-10 tournament where they lost to VCU. They received an at-large bid to the NCAA tournament where they lost in the second round to Iowa.

Previous season 
The 2013–14 Davidson Wildcats finished the season with an overall record of 20–13, with a record of 15–1 in the Southern Conference regular season to capture the Southern Conference regular season champions. In the 2014 SoCon tournament, the Wildcats were defeated by Western Carolina, 99–97 in overtime in the semifinals. As a regular season conference champion who failed to win their conference tournament, they received an automatic bid to the National Invitation Tournament where they lost in the first round to Missouri.

Off season

Departures

Incoming recruits

Roster

Schedule

|-
!colspan=9 style="background:#; color:white;"| Exhibition

|-
!colspan=9 style="background:#; color:white;"| Non-conference regular season

|-
!colspan=9 style="background:#; color:white;"| Atlantic 10 regular season

|-
!colspan=9 style="background:#; color:white;"| Atlantic 10 tournament

|-
!colspan=9 style="background:#; color:white;"| NCAA tournament

See also
2014–15 Davidson Wildcats women's basketball team

References

Davidson Wildcats men's basketball seasons
Davidson
Davidson
2014 in sports in North Carolina
2015 in sports in North Carolina